The Achaemenid destruction of Athens was carried out by the Achaemenid Army of Xerxes I during the Second Persian invasion of Greece, and occurred in two phases over a period of two years, in 480–479 BCE.

First phase: Xerxes I (480 BCE)

In 480 BCE, after the victory of Xerxes I at the Battle of Thermopylae, all of Boeotia fell to the Achaemenid Army. The two cities that had resisted Xerxes, Thespiae and Plataea, were captured and razed. Attica was also left open to invasion, and the remaining population of Athens was thus evacuated, with the aid of the Allied fleet, to Salamis. The Peloponnesian Allies began to prepare a defensive line across the Isthmus of Corinth, building a wall, and demolishing the road from Megara, thereby abandoning Athens to the Persians.

Athens fell a first time in September 480 BCE. The small number of Athenians who had barricaded themselves on the Acropolis were eventually defeated, and Xerxes then ordered Athens to be torched. The Acropolis was razed, and the Old Temple of Athena and the Older Parthenon destroyed:

Shortly thereafter, Xerxes I lost a large part of his fleet to the Greeks in the Battle of Salamis. With the Persians' naval superiority removed, Xerxes feared that the Greeks might sail to the Hellespont and destroy the pontoon bridges. According to Herodotus, Mardonius volunteered to remain in Greece and complete the conquest with a hand-picked group of troops, while advising Xerxes to retreat to Asia with the bulk of the army. All of the Persian forces abandoned Attica, with Mardonius over-wintering in Boeotia and Thessaly.

Some Athenians were thus able to return to their burnt-out city for the winter. They would have to evacuate again in front of a second advance by Mardonius in June 479 BCE.

Second phase: Mardonius (479 BCE)

Mardonius remained with the rest of the Achaemenid troops in northern Greece. He selected some of the best troops to remain with him in Greece, especially Immortals, the Medes, the Sacae, the Bactrians and the Indians. Herodotus described the composition of the principal troops of Mardonius:

Mardonius remained in Thessaly, knowing an attack on the isthmus was pointless, while the Allies refused to send an army outside the Peloponessus.

Mardonius moved to break the stalemate, by offering peace, self-government and territorial expansion to the Athenians (with the aim of thereby removing their fleet from the Allied forces), using Alexander I of Macedon as an intermediary. The Athenians made sure that a Spartan delegation was on hand to hear the offer, but rejected it. Athens was thus evacuated again, and the Persians marched south and re-took possession of it.

Mardonius brought even more thorough destruction to the city, and some authors considered that the city was truly razed to the ground during this second phase. According to Herodotus, after the negotiations broke off:

Perserschutt
Numerous remains of statues vandalized by the Achaemenids have been found, known collectively as the "Perserschutt", or "Persian rubble":

The statue Nike of Callimachus, which was erected next to the Older Parthenon in honor of Callimachus and the victory at the Battle of Marathon, was severely damaged by the Achaemenids. The statue depicts Nike (Victory), in the form of a woman with wings, on top of an inscribed column. Its height is 4.68 meters and was made of Parian marble. The head of the statue and parts of the torso and hands were never recovered.

Xerxes also took away some of the statuary, such as The Tyrant-slayers, a bronze statue of Harmodius and Haristogiton which was recovered by Alexander the Great in the Achaemenid capital of Susa two centuries later.

Reconstruction

The Achaemenids were decisively beaten at the ensuing Battle of Plataea, and the Greeks were able to recover Athens. They had to rebuild everything, including a new Parthenon on the Acropolis. These efforts at reconstruction were led by Themistocles in the autumn of 479 BC, who reused remains of the Older Parthenon and Old Temple of Athena to reinforce the walls of the Acropolis, which are still visible today in the North Wall of the Acropolis. His priority was probably to repair the walls and build up the defenses of the city, before even endeavouring to rebuild temples. Themistocles in particular is considered as the builder of the northern wall of the Acropolis incorporating the debris of the destroyed temples, while Cimon is associated with the later building of the southern wall.

The Themistoclean Wall, named after Themistocles, was built right after the war with Persia, in the hope of defending against further invasion. A lot of this building efforts was accomplished using spolia, remains of the destructions from the preceding conflict.

The Parthenon was only rebuilt much later, after more than 30 years had elapsed, by Pericles, possibly because of an original vow that the Temples destroyed by the Achaemenids should not be rebuilt.

Retaliatory burning of the Palace of Persepolis

In 330 BCE, Alexander the Great burned down the palace of Persepolis, the principal residence of the defeated Achaemenid dynasty, after a drinking party and at the instigation of Thais. According to Plutarch and Diodorus, this was intended as a retribution for Xerxes' burning of the old Temple of Athena on the Acropolis in Athens (the site of the extant Parthenon) in 480 BC during the Persian Wars.

References

Sources
Holland, Tom (2006). Persian Fire: The First World Empire and the Battle for the West. Abacus, .

External links

Ancient Athens
Greco-Persian Wars
480 BC
479 BC
Razed cities
Demolition